Four ships of the Royal Navy have been named HMS Argonaut after the Argonauts of Greek mythology:

  was a 64-gun third rate, originally the French ship Jason, captured in 1782 in the West Indies and broken up in 1831.
  was a  armoured cruiser launched in 1898 and broken up in 1921.
  was a  light cruiser launched in 1941 and sold in 1955.
  was a  frigate launched in 1966 and broken up in 1995.

Battle honours
Ships named Argonaut have earned the following battle honours:
Arctic 1942
North Africa 1942
Mediterranean 1942
Normandy 1944
Aegean 1944
Okinawa 1945
Falkland Islands 1982

References

Royal Navy ship names